Karakol is a city in the Issyk-Kul region of Kyrgyzstan.

Karakol may also refer to:

Karaköl, Jalal-Abad, Kyrgyzstan
Karakol', a village Üch-Terek, Kyrgyzstan
Karakol, Russia 
Karakol, Ust-Kansky District, Altai Republic, Russia
Karakol, Ongudaysky District, Altai Republic, Russia 
Karakol (Chu basin), a lake in Moiynkum District, Kazakhstan
Karakol (Shalkarteniz), a lake in Yrgyz District, Kazakhstan
Karakol culture, a Bronze Age culture in the modern-day Altai Republic
Karakol Peak, a mountain in Issyk-Kul, Kyrgyzstan 
Karakol society, a Turkish political group

See also
 Qaragol (disambiguation)
 Caracol (disambiguation)
 Karakul (disambiguation)